Deny Marcel (born 24 February 1983) is an Indonesian footballer who plays as a goalkeeper.

External links 
  

Indonesian footballers
Living people
1983 births
Sportspeople from East Kalimantan
People from Balikpapan
Persiba Balikpapan players
Arema F.C. players
Persim Maros players
Persela Lamongan players
Persebaya Surabaya players
PSM Makassar players
Persiram Raja Ampat players
Liga 1 (Indonesia) players
Indonesian Premier League players
Association football goalkeepers